The 1944 United States Senate election in Washington was held on November 7, 1944. Incumbent Democratic U.S. Senator Homer Bone resigned in April, having been appointed and confirmed to the United States Court of Appeals for the Ninth Circuit in April. Democratic U.S. Representative Warren Magnuson won the open race over Republican Harry Cain, the mayor of Tacoma and was appointed to the vacant seat.

Blanket primary
The blanket primary was held on July 11, 1944.

Candidates

Democratic
John A. Hogg
Warren G. Magnuson, U.S. Representative from Seattle since 1937
Martin F. Smith, former U.S. Representative from Hoquiam (1933–1943)

Republican
Stella Alene Blanchard, candidate for U.S. House from Goldendale in 1942
Harry P. Cain, Mayor of Tacoma since 1940
Gordon B. Dodd
J. Parkhurst Douglas
Howard E. Foster, candidate for U.S. Senate in 1938 and 1940
Joseph A. Mallery, Justice of the Washington Supreme Court
Charles Arlin Nave
Clement L. Niswonger
Edwin L. Rice
Cameron Sherwood, candidate for U.S. House from Walla Walla in 1942
Herb Sieler, nominee for U.S. House from Chehalis in 1936

Results

General election

Candidates
 Harry P. Cain, Mayor of Tacoma (Republican)
 Warren Magnuson, U.S. Representative from Seattle (Democratic)
 Ray C. Roberts (Socialist)
 Josephine B. Sulston (Prohibition)

Results

After the election, Governor Arthur B. Langlie appointed Magnuson to the vacant seat left by Bone's resignation, and he took office on December 14.

Cain would win election to Washington's other Senate seat in 1946 and served alongside Magnuson from 1947 to 1953.

See also 
 1944 United States Senate elections

Notes

References 

1944
United States Senate
Washington